The Monégasque records in swimming are the fastest ever performances of swimmers from Monaco, which are recognised and ratified by the Federation Monegasque de Natation.

All records were set in finals unless noted otherwise.

Long Course (50 m)

Men

Women

Short Course (25 m)

Men

Women

References

Monaco
Records
Swimming